Jonquière station is a Via Rail station in Saguenay, Quebec, Canada. It is located on rue Saint-Dominique in the former city of Jonquière. It is the final stop of Via Rail's Montreal–Jonquière train. The station is staffed and is wheelchair-accessible.

External links

Via Rail stations in Quebec
Buildings and structures in Saguenay, Quebec
Transport in Saguenay, Quebec